Palais Niederösterreich, historically known as the Niederösterreichisches Landeshaus (Estates House of Lower Austria), is a historical building in Vienna. The building housed the estates general of the state of Lower Austria until 1848.  After 1861, the state assembly and some state government ministries occupied it until 1997, when St. Pölten fully took on the role of the new capital of Lower Austria.

In the revolution of March 1848, the Niederösterreichisches Landeshaus played an important role as the focal point of the revolutionary forces. The uprising was subsequently crushed by the military.

In 1918 it was the seat of the parliament of the new Republic of German Austria.

After the legislature and the ministries moved out of the building in 1997, the building underwent substantial renovations and restoration work, and is now used for exhibitions and for private functions and events. It was renamed the Palais Niederösterreich in 2004.

External links
 Palais Niederösterreich Homepage

Niederosterreich
Buildings and structures in Innere Stadt
Neoclassical architecture in Austria
Government buildings in Austria